"Shake It Up" is a song by American rock band the Cars from their fourth studio album of the same name (1981). It was released on November 9, 1981, as the album's lead single. Although appearing for the first time in 1981, it was actually written years earlier by the band's songwriter and lead singer Ric Ocasek. The song became one of the Cars' most popular songs, peaking at number four on the Billboard Hot 100 and number two on the Billboard Top Tracks chart in early 1982. With the track "Cruiser" as its B-side, it reached number 14 on the Billboard Disco Top 80 chart.

Background
The song is primarily reliant on dance-pop as its main genre, with pop rock elements audible. Ocasek referred to the song as "the big return to pop" after the more art rock style of the preceding album, Panorama. Add to these keyboardist Greg Hawkes' synthesizer lines, the associated instrument of bands labeled "new wave" at the time, and it is a prime example of The Cars' genre blending.

Drummer David Robinson said at first he did not even want to record the song, as it was "kicking around for years. It never sounded good. We recorded it a couple of times in the studio and dumped it, and we were going to try it one more time, and I was fighting everybody . . . So we thought, let's start all over again, like we've never even heard it—completely change every part—and we did. Then, when it was through and all put back together, it was like a brand-new song."

Guitarist Elliot Easton said he wanted his solo to sound like "two guys trading off". He first plays a Fender Telecaster, in a style skewing country, then midway through the solo switches to a Gibson guitar for a heavier rock sound.

Billboard said that "Ric Ocasek's vocals are surrounded by a steady guitar/keyboard beat that has a mesmerizing effect." Record World said that "A rapid-pulse rhythm supports melodic keyboard enchantment, stinging guitars and an undeniable chorus hook."

Lyrics
The song references dance moves, hair styles and having fun. However, bassist Benjamin Orr has stated the song tells the story of how important it is to make a mark in life, to "let them know what you really mean". Thus, the song has an existential element as well as a simple message.

Ocasek has since dismissed the song's lyrics, saying, "I'm not proud of the lyrics to 'Shake It Up.

Cover versions
Chilean band Los Prisioneros did an interpolation of the song "Shake It Up" called "Pa Pa Pa" on their album La cultura de la basura.

Charts

Weekly charts

Year-end charts

References

1981 songs
1981 singles
The Cars songs
Elektra Records singles
Song recordings produced by Roy Thomas Baker
Songs written by Ric Ocasek